The following is a list of public housing estates in Shau Kei Wan, Hong Kong, including Home Ownership Scheme (HOS), Private Sector Participation Scheme (PSPS), Sandwich Class Housing Scheme (SCHS), Flat-for-Sale Scheme (FFSS), and Tenants Purchase Scheme (TPS) estates.

History

Overview

Aldrich Garden 

Aldrich Garden is a Home Ownership Scheme and a Private Sector Participation Scheme estate in the reclaimed land of Aldrich Bay, Shau Kei Wan, Hong Kong. It was completed in 2001, which consists of 10 residential buildings that offer a total of 2,972 flats. Gross floor area and saleable area ranging from 46 to 71 square metres and 40 to 55 square metres respectively.

Houses

Hing Tung Estate 

Hing Tung Estate is located in a former squatter areas at a hill in Southwest Shau Kei Wan, the estate consists of 3 rental buildings and 1 HOS building, Tung Lam Court, a Housing for Senior Citizens. They were completed in 1996 and 1997 respectively.

Houses

Hong Tung Estate 

Hong Tung Estate was built on reclaimed land of the north of Island Eastern Corridor and near Lei King Wan and Tsui Woo Terrace, Tai Koo Shing.

The estate has 1 residential building with about 500 flats. Some of the flats are offered to senior citizen tenants.

Hong Tung Estate is in Primary One Admission (POA) School Net 14. Within the school net are multiple aided schools (operated independently but funded with government money) and North Point Government Primary School.

Houses

Oi Tung Estate 

Oi Tung Estate was built on reclaimed land of Aldrich Bay, Shau Kei Wan, Hong Kong, with Tung Yuk Court and Aldrich Garden, two Home Ownership Scheme courts. It consists of 6 residential blocks completed, providing a total of 3,900 flats.

Houses

Yiu Tung Estate 

Yiu Tung Estate was constructed in a former squatter areas at a hill in Southwest Shau Kei Wan, the estate consists of 11 residential buildings built in 1994 and 1995 respectively. The Yiu Tung Public Library is located within the estate.

Houses

Ming Wah Dai Ha 

Ming Wah Dai Ha comprises 13 residential blocks completed between 1962 and 1978. It is the oldest existing public housing estate developed by the Hong Kong Housing Society. It was named for Bishop Ronald Owen Hall, one of the founders of Hong Kong Housing Society. Block A was built in 1965 and redeveloped in 1978 and Block 1 (30 stories) and Block 2 (31 stories) were redeveloped in 2021.

Notable former residents include Aaron Kwok.

Houses

Tung Chun Court 

Tung Chun Court is a Home Ownership Scheme court in a former squatter areas at a hill in Southwest Shau Kei Wan, near Yiu Tung Estate. It has two blocks completed in 1994.

Houses

Tung Hei Court 

Tung Hei Court is a Home Ownership Scheme court in Shau Kei Wan, near Hing Tung Estate. It has totally 4 residential towers providing 2,432 domestic units, which were completed in 1995.

Houses

Tung Lam Court 

Tung Lam Court is a Home Ownership Scheme court in Shau Kei Wan near Hing Tung Estate. Formerly the site of squatter areas, the court has one block completed in 1997.

House

Tung Shing Court 

Tung Shing Court is a Home Ownership Scheme court in a former squatter areas at a hill in Southwest Shau Kei Wan, near Yiu Tung Estate. It has one block completed in 2000.

House

Tung Tao Court 

Tung Tao Court is a Home Ownership Scheme court on the waterfront of the reclaimed land of Aldrich Bay in Shau Kei Wan. It originally comprised 5 concord towers completed in 2005. Four of them are HOS blocks and were sold to public through the Sale of Surplus HOS Flats Phase 3 and 4 in 2008. One of them is public rental housing block. It was later reassigned to nearby Oi Tung Estate and renamed as "Oi Po House".

Houses

Tung Yan Court 

Tung Yan Court is a Home Ownership Scheme court in Shau Kei Wan. Formerly the site of squatter areas, the court consists of 2 blocks completed in 1998 and 1999.

Houses

Tung Yuk Court 

Tung Yuk Court is a Home Ownership Scheme court on the waterfront of the reclaimed land of Aldrich Bay in Shau Kei Wan. It comprises 5 concord towers with 1600 flats completed in 2001, and many units have full sea views over the harbour and Lei Yue Mun.

Houses

See also
 Public housing in Hong Kong
 List of public housing estates in Hong Kong

References 

Shau Kei Wan